The GCR Class 8F was a class of ten 4-6-0 locomotives built for the Great Central Railway in 1906 by Beyer, Peacock and Company to the design of John G. Robinson for working fast goods and fish trains. They passed to the London and North Eastern Railway at the 1923 grouping and received the classification 'B4'.

Design
The new design was very similar to 4-6-0 the two locomotives of the (GCR Class 8C, later LNER class B1) except that they had smaller driving wheels.

They were built with a saturated boiler, inside slide valves and Stephenson valve gear, two outside cylinders connected to  diameter driving wheels.

LNER ownership
The ten locomotives were renumbered by the LNER by adding 5000 to their GCR numbers; and classified as B4.

Modifications
Between 1925 and 1928 the whole class received superheated boilers, but six received 10-inch piston valves and 21-inch cylinders giving rise to two LNER sub-classes B4/1 and B4/2.

The LNER had designed a new type of superheated boiler (Diagram 16) based on the old design (Diagram 15). These were used on the B1 and B4 class locomotives; no more of this type of boiler was made after 1932, and so to keep the B1 and B4s in service during World War II, some Diagram 15 boilers were modified for use with these locomotives.

Allocation and work
The class were originally used on fish trains between the port of Grimsby and London and Manchester although they were also found to be successful passenger locomotives. No. 1097 was also chosen to haul the special train at the inauguration ceremony for the new port of Immingham in 1906, and was named ‘Immingham’ thereafter, giving the name to the whole class. After grouping the class was transferred to Ardsley, South Yorkshire and did much useful work in the West Riding of Yorkshire.

Withdrawal
No.6095 was withdrawn in 1939, but was reinstated three months later due to the outbreak of war and an expected shortage of locomotive power. After a collision at Woodhead in 1944, No.6095 was officially withdrawn. The remaining 9 were renumbered 1481-1489 in order of construction in 1946. They were withdrawn between 1947 and 1950. The last withdrawal, No.(6)1482(GCR No.1097)Immingham was in 1950, with Immingham being the last GCR 4-6-0 to be withdrawn.

References

LNER Class B4/GCR Class 8F

4-6-0 locomotives
2′C n2 locomotives
08C
Beyer, Peacock locomotives
Railway locomotives introduced in 1906
Scrapped locomotives
Standard gauge steam locomotives of Great Britain
Freight locomotives
 Great Central Railway 4-6-0s